The Griggs County Courthouse in Cooperstown, North Dakota was built in 1884. It was listed on the National Register of Historic Places in 1977.

Within the courthouse grounds is an 1879 log house built by Omund Nelson Opheim, which was moved to here from 10 miles northeast of Cooperstown.  It is believed to be the first house in Griggs County built by a white settler.

References

Courthouses on the National Register of Historic Places in North Dakota
County courthouses in North Dakota
Gothic Revival architecture in North Dakota
Government buildings completed in 1884
National Register of Historic Places in Griggs County, North Dakota
1884 establishments in Dakota Territory